The 'Barbados Yacht Club' was established in 1924 in Barbados. In 1932 it became the Royal Barbados Yacht Club. In 1967 it lost the use of the Royal honorific and reverted to the Barbados Yacht Club.

References

Royal Barbados Yacht Club
Yacht clubs in Barbados
Sport in Barbados
1924 establishments in Barbados